Hanjin Heavy Industries and Construction Philippines, known as HHIC Phil, was established in February 2006 by Hanjin Heavy Industries and Construction of South Korea. In the same month, the first ship building contract was signed for 4 container ships. In May 2006, the construction of a shipyard began on Redondo Peninsula - on the northern edge of Subic Bay.

The first vessel "Argolikos" was delivered in July 2008 for the Greek ship owner Dioryx. As of April 2011, the shipyard had delivered 20 ships. In 2013, the shipyard made its first oil tanker and in 2016, it delivered its first gas carrier. Additionally, the shipyard has also built parts of CALM buoys used for the Malampaya offshore project. The shipyard also has two large drydocks.

In January 2019, the company filed for the biggest bankruptcy in the Philippines with unpaid loan obligations amounting to $412 million.

Background 
As a part of its expansion process overseas, in 2004, Hanjin Heavy Industries Corporation started construction of a shipyard in Redondo peninsula, north of Subic bay, Zambales, Philippines. As per the HHIC website, this has resulted in the fourth-largest shipyard in the world. As of September 2011, the shipyard employed 21,000 Filipino people.

According to The New York Times on April 29, 2012: "On April 18, a subsidiary of Huntington Ingalls Industries, a United States defense contractor, announced a deal to work with Hanjin Heavy Industries, which maintains a shipbuilding and repair facility at the former base at Subic Bay. That opens the door to large-scale servicing of United States military ships there for the first time in almost 20 years." Huntington Ingalls said in a news release that the companies “will work together in providing maintenance, repair and logistics services to the U.S. Navy and other customers in the Western Pacific region.”

HHIC Philippines' workforce was expected to increase to nearly 28,000 in 2016, however, a slump in shipbuilding projects had limited the workforce to 20,000 people as of 2017.

As of September 2017, HHIC Phil is the largest shipyard in the Philippines and one of the largest private employers in the country.

Shipyard 

The shipyard is located at the tip of the Redondo peninsula, in sitio Agusuhin, in the province of Zambales, Luzon, Philippines. A large number of Koreans and Romanians who form the higher level management of the shipyard live inside the shipyard, in barracks accommodations (often jocularly called chicken coops). The land here is owned by Subic Bay Metropolitan Authority and leased out to HHIC Phil on a 40-year basis.

Jeepneys and buses hired by HHIC transport workers run every day between the shipyard and the two nearby towns of Castillejos and Subic, with many others staying farther out in Olongapo and San Marcelino. Most workers come to work at HHIC from other parts of the Philippines and stay in boarding houses in these towns. A large ferry takes workers to and from Olongapo daily. The company also charters 25 buses to transport its workers to and from Olongapo daily.

Additionally, two smaller fast ferries owned by HHIC transport a small number of owners representatives from the Hanjin jetty (near All Hands Beach, Subic Bay Freeport Zone) to the shipyard. Security to access the shipyard remains tight due to high pilferage by workers during the early years of the shipyard. The area is also strategically important to the Philippine Armed Forces, hence is protected by both HHIC Police and Philippine armed forces commandos.

Bankruptcy 

On 22 November 2018, HHIC Phil delivered two recently completed 114,000 DWT crude oil tankers. However, with 20 vessels currently in different stages of construction, the shipyard found it difficult to service its high debts or to get further extensions from its lenders. On January 8, 2019, the yard filed for corporate rehabilitation due to default or failure to comply with its loan obligation of $412 million to five Philippine banks, namely Rizal Commercial Banking Corp., Land Bank, Metrobank, Bank of the Philippine Islands, and Banco de Oro. This became the biggest bankruptcy in the Philippines, surpassing the $386 million  default by Lehman Brothers in the Philippines in 2008. The five bank creditors are working to take over HHIC Phil's shipyard. On 19 January 2019, it was reported that two Chinese firms had filed expressions of interest to purchase the shipyard along with its debt. Subsequently, Trade Winds reported that HHIC Phil and the Philippine government had agreed upon a debt swap deal.

Labor

Nationalities employed 
The managerial staff in the shipyard consists of around 100 Koreans. The mid-manager level staff includes Koreans, Romanians and Filipinos. The foremen for workers include Koreans, Filipinos and Romanians, most of them employed by subsidiary companies of HHIC Phil operated by Filipinos. Most of the approximately 200 Romanian workers are employed in dock 5 and a few in dock 6 through the Romanian recruitment company Gateway Trading SRL. Most of the workers, nearly 19,000, are Filipino, as of 2017. The shipyard provides free lunch, dinner and breakfast to all its workers in five large canteens.

Alleged labor violations 
While HHIC's presence in Subic has brought thousands of jobs to the area, a steady stream of accidental workplace deaths and alleged labor violations has called into question the company's compliance with Philippine labor and occupational safety laws. During a two-month span in 2008, five workers were killed in accidents that may have resulted from unsafe working conditions. This prompted investigations by the Subic Bay Metropolitan Authority and Philippine Congress, which found violations of safety and labor laws. At the conclusion of the Congressional investigation, legislators required Hanjin to build a medical center and comply with industrial safety laws within six months. Workers have since continued to express complaints of abuse on the part of management; one such incident was caught on camera and distributed to the Filipino news station ABS-CBN. Many workers have also begun to organize to attain union recognition. According to organizers, who have started a blog to document abuses, 60 employees have been terminated for union-related activity and over 30 have been killed in workplace accidents since the shipyard opened in 2006. Filipino church groups like the Caritas Filipinas Foundation have also rallied around the workers. HHIC-Phil general manager Pyeong Jong Yu has expressed commitment to preventing future incidents.

Since 2011, standards of safety at the shipyard have improved, especially after ship owners introduced their own health and safety teams to augment the shipyard efforts.

Ships built 
The shipyard builds bulk carriers, container ships and oil tankers. Additionally, it has undertaken offshore construction work such as CALM buoys for offshore projects such as the Malampaya offshore project.

Types of ship built
Container ships - Capacity in TEUs - 4,300, 3,600 and 12,800
Bulk carriers - Capacity 135,000 tonnes, 175,000 tonnes, 205,000 tonnes
VLCC - capacity 320,000 tonnes

Notable ships

 M/V Argolikos- container (First container ship built in Philippines, First ship built by HHIC Phil)
 M/T Leyla K- tanker - Largest oil tanker built in Philippines - as of October 2011
 CMA CGM Antoine de Saint Exupery (2018) - Container, CMA CGM (France)

References

External links 
 
 SBMA chair cites Korean ship builder’s role in Phl economy, Philippine Information Agency

Shipbuilding companies of the Philippines
Companies based in Zambales
Philippine subsidiaries of foreign companies